New York attack may refer to:

List of terrorist incidents in New York City
2001 September 11 attacks
2017 New York City truck attack
2017 New York City Subway bombing